= Constituency RSM-165 =

Reserved constituency of the Provincial Assembly of Sindh, Pakistan

RSM-165
- Provincial Reserved constituency for the Provincial Assembly of Sindh

Current constituency

RSM-165 is a reserved Constituency of the Provincial Assembly of Sindh.

== See also ==
- Sindh
